Crowning may refer to:

 Crowning, the second stage of childbirth
 Coronation
 Marriage in the Eastern Orthodox Church
 During a wildfire, crown fires may spontaneously ignite in a process called crowning